Adolf Ogi (born 18 July 1942) is a Swiss politician from the village of Kandersteg in the Swiss Alps.

He was elected to the Swiss Federal Council on 9 December 1987, as member of the Swiss People's Party from the Canton of Berne. He handed over office on 31 December 2000.

During his time in office, he was in charge of the following departments:
 Federal Department of Transport, Communications and Energy (1988 – 1995)
 Federal Military Department (from 1996), later named Federal Department of Defence, Civil Protection and Sports (1998 – 2000)

He was President of the Confederation twice in 1993 and 2000.

From 2001 to 2008, Ogi was a Special Adviser on Sport for Development and Peace to the United Nations Secretary-General.

Ogi is today an ambassador for Peace and Sport, a Monaco-based international organization, committed to serving peace in the world through sport.

Ogi was awarded an honorary doctorate by the European University.

Ogi released a biography entitled Dölf Ogi: Statesman and Sportsman.

Ogi received the Gold Olympic Order in the year 2000.

References

External links 

 UN Special Adviser on Sport for Development and Peace
 
 
 Business activities of Adolf Ogi, Swiss Register of Corporations

Members of the Federal Council (Switzerland)
1942 births
Living people
Swiss People's Party politicians
Recipients of the Olympic Order
People from Frutigen-Niedersimmental District
Swiss Protestants
20th-century Swiss politicians
21st-century Swiss politicians